The 2020–21 Billie Jean King Cup was the 58th edition of the international women's tennis team's tournament and the first to be styled as the  Billie Jean King Cup.

For this edition, the format of the cup was changed. The main modification is the World Group taking place at one location and in one week, with twelve teams divided in four round-robin groups of three teams each, with the winners of each group advancing to the semi-finals. The series between the teams in this stage featured two singles matches and one doubles match. As the World Group takes place as one single tournament, the event has been named the Billie Jean King Cup Finals. The lower zone groups I, II and III were composed of round-robin group play deciding promotion or relegation.

This edition was played over two years because of the COVID-19 pandemic: The Finals were originally scheduled to be held 17 to 18 April 2020 but were postponed to the following year and finally took place in November 2021.

Billie Jean King Cup Finals

Date: 1–6 November 2021  
Venue: O2 Arena, Prague, Czech Republic 
Surface: Hard (i)

12 nations took part in the Finals, formerly known as World Group. The qualification was as follows:
 2 finalists of the previous edition
 1 host nation
 1 wild card
 8 winners of a qualifier round, in February 2020

Qualifying round 

Date: 7–8 February 2020

Sixteen teams played for eight spots in the Finals, in series decided on a home and away basis.

These sixteen teams were:
 2 losing semifinalists of the previous edition,
 7 winners & losers of World Group play-offs of previous edition, and
 4 winners of World Group II play-offs of previous edition, and
 3 losers of World Group II play-offs of previous edition, based on rankings

The 8 losing teams from the qualifying round played the new play-offs, which ranked the 8 nations that were promoted from the Regional Group I from Americas, Europe/Africa and Asia/Oceania, to see who had to play the 2022 Qualifiers and who stayed in the Regional Group I in 2022.

#: Nations Ranking as of 29 June 2019.

Group stage 

T = Ties, M = Matches, S = Sets

Knockout stage

Play-offs 

Date: 16–17 April 2021

Sixteen teams played for eight spots in the 2021 Qualifying Round, in series decided on a home and away basis.

These Sixteen teams were:
 8 losing teams from Qualifying round.
 8 winning teams from their Group I zone.

Eight winners advanced to the 2022 Qualifying Round and eight losers contest regional Group I event in 2022.

Seeded teams
 
 
 
 
 
 
 
 

Unseeded teams
 
 
 
 
 
 
 
 

Americas Zone

Group I 

Venue: Club Palestino, Santiago, Chile (clay)

Dates: 5–8 February 2020

Participating teams

Pool A

Pool B

Play-offs 

Group II 
Venue 1: Centro de Alto Rendimiento Fred Maduro, Panama City, Panama (clay)  Venue 2: Club de Tenis La Paz, La Paz, Bolivia (clay)

Dates: 23–26 June 2021 (Panama City) and 27–30 October 2021 (La Paz)

Participating teams

Pool A (Panama City)

Pool B (Panama City)

  

Pool A (La Paz)

Pool B (La Paz)

Play-offs 

Asia/Oceania Zone

Group I 
Venue: Aviation Club Tennis Centre, Dubai, United Arab Emirates (hard)

Dates: 3–7 March 2020

Participating teams
Pool A

Promotions

Group II 
Venue 1: Renouf Tennis Centre, Wellington, New Zealand (hard)  Venue 2: Sri Lanka Tennis Association Complex, Colombo, Sri Lanka (clay)

Dates: 4–8 February 2020 (Wellington)

Due to COVID-19 restrictions, the event in Sri Lanka could not be held. The Billie Jean King Cup committee decided that in light of the challenges of identifying and appointing a new host nation during the remainder of the 2021 tennis season, the event would take place in 2021. The seven competing nations, Hong Kong China, Iran, Malaysia, Oman, Sri Lanka, Tajikistan and Vietnam, remained in Asia/Oceania Group II, and they competed in the 2022 competition.

Participating teams

Pool A (Wellington)

Pool B (Wellington)

Remaining nations

Remaining nations

Play-offs 

  was promoted to Asia/Oceania Zone Group I in 2022.

Europe/Africa Zone

Group I 
Venue 1: Tallinn Tennis Center, Tallinn, Estonia (indoor hard)  Venue 2: Centre National de Tennis, Esch-sur-Alzette, Luxembourg (indoor hard)

Dates: 5–8 February 2020

Participating teams

Pool A (Tallinn) 

Pool B (Tallinn) 

Pool A (Esch-sur-Alzette) 

Pool B (Esch-sur-Alzette)

Play-offs 

Group II 
Venue: Tali Tennis Center, Helsinki, Finland (indoor hard)

Dates: 4–7 February 2020

Participating teams

Pool A 
 

Pool B

Play-offs 

Group III 
Venue: SEB Arena, Vilnius, Lithuania (indoor hard)

Dates: 15–19 June 2021

Participating teams

Pool A

Pool B
 

Pool C

Pool D

Pool E

 

Pool F

Play-offs 

References

External links 
 billiejeankingcup.com

 
2020
2020 in women's tennis
2021 in women's tennis
Billie Jean King Cup